Satya Dharma is a humanistic and monotheistic new religious movement in Bangladesh and West Bengal, India, which developed from Hinduism.

Influence 
Satya Dharma is influenced by Islam, Humanism, Brahmo Samaj, Buddhism, Baul, Secularism, the Bhakti movement and Bengali culture. It was founded by Mohatma Gurunath Sengupta who was a great spiritual personality and a famous Bengali Sanskrit scholar and philosopher. He wrote many books about religion, humanity, philosophy, and ethics. 

There are 500,000 to 800,000 followers of this religion, scattered throughout West Bengal and Bangladesh. The shrine of Mohatma Gurunath Sengupta at Goalgram, Muksudpur, Gopalganj in Bangladesh is considered one of the holy places by the followers. Some followers are in Maharashtra, India. 

The religion is created by Mahatma Gurunath Sengupta and it is spread by Mahatma Nibaran Chandra Pandey.

It talks about the rule of living life and improve your qualities through pray to God. It tells God is one and we are the followers.

Mahatma Gurunath Sengupta(1848-1914) Sanskrit scholar, was born at Narail in the district of jessore. Having passed his triannual examinations from Kolkata Normal School in 1867, he obtained the title of Kaviratna (A gem among poets). He taught at Ahiritola Bangabidyalay in Kolkata. He wrote several volumes of poems, commentaries and annotations, religious discourse and philosophy, novels and collections of essays in Sanskrit and Bangla. Among his important books in Sanskrit are Satyadharma (Eternal religion), Gunaratnam (Virtues), Satyamrta (The nectar of truth), Gunasutram (Aphoristic texts on virtues), Dharmajijnasa (Religious discourse), Shriramacharitam (an epic on Rama), Shrigaurabrttam (epic), Baridutam (The rain messenger), Patnishatakam (Verses on wives), Shiksashatakam (Verses on education) etc. Among his books in Bangla, Tattvajnan (Philosophy), Dampatidharmalap (Religious discourse of a couple), Adbhut Upakhyan (A strange story), Kamalini (epic) and Subhadraharan (epic) are admired. 

Gurunath Sengupta was also known as a votary of spiritualism. After austere ascetic practice and self-persuasion stretching for a period of over thirty years, he reached attainment and preached a new religious creed called satyadharma (eternal religion), which professed self-elevation through practice of virtues in the form of the worship of God.

8 times in a year followers from this religion met and pray to god they called it Utsab(Occasion) 6 of them invented by Mahatma Nibaran Chandra pandey.Every tuesday people from this religion met together and pray to God this one is created by Paresh chandra pandey son of Mahatma Nibaran Chandra pandey.

Songs are written and composed by Mahatma Gurunath Sengupta ,Gourpriyo sarkar.

Satyadharma mahamondal is the organization which is responsible for this religions activities.Mahatma Nibaran smriti rakhsa samiti,Satyadharma seva trust (Gujarat branch)are other responsible organization for taking this religion forward.

A special Mantra of this religion is ""Satya Sanatana Patito Pavana Nitya Niranjana Bibhu Jay Jay"" Created by Mahatma Nibaran Chandra Pandey.

References

History of religion in India
Nirguna worship traditions
Hindu denominations
Hindu new religious movements
New religious movements